Syre is a small settlement, located within Strath Naver, in Sutherland, Scottish Highlands and is in the Scottish council area of Highland.

Populated places in Sutherland